The International Star Registry (ISR) is an organization founded in 1979, which sells the right to unofficially name stars.

Overview 
The company sells the right to unofficially name a star, often as a gift or memorial. These names are recorded in the book Your Place in the Cosmos, and are not recognized by the scientific or astronomical community as the International Astronomical Union is the only internationally recognized authority for naming celestial bodies. Some astronomers have criticized the registry for not conforming to the IAU's designations while others, like Edward Bowell, approved of it. The company's director of marketing Elaine Stolpe stated that "the service is not intended for scientific research; it is intended as a lasting gift."

Since its founding, the International Star Registry has catalogued individual stars using coordinate data. It previously used data from the Smithsonian Astrophysical Observatory Star Catalog, before switching to using data from the NASA Star Guide, which allowed them to locate stars down to the 16th magnitude. The stars are catalogued on charts stored at the International Star Registry headquarters, and a catalogue of named stars is stored in a vault in Switzerland.

Customers are given a signed certificate, a booklet of star charts, and a chart identifying the named star. Packages sold by the company include framed certificates and personalized jewelry. The text of the certificates, with its blank spaces filled in by hand, is:

History 
International Star Registry of Illinois was started in Toronto in 1979 by Ivor Downie. The International Star Registry is thought to be the earliest commercial star naming company. That year, the Toronto International Film Festival announced that it had purchased the naming rights to stars in the Andromeda Galaxy from the company, and would be naming them after festival patrons. In 1980, John and Phyllis Mosele bought an American franchise of the company. Phyllis had first learned of the company when she named a star for her husband as a gift.

The American company quickly grew in popularity, appearing on AM Chicago and Wally Phillips' WGN Morning Show. They purchased sole ownership in 1981 after Downie's death. The present owner of the company is Rocky Mosele, one of John and Phyllis Mosele's twelve children. The company has published nine large volumes of the copyrighted book named Your Place in the Cosmos.

After the 1986 Space Shuttle Challenger disaster, the city of Daytona Beach named a star after each of the seven astronauts who died in the accident through the ISR.

In 1998, the International Star Registry was issued a complaint by the New York City Department of Consumer Affairs for deceptive advertising for claiming "official" naming rights. The Illinois Attorney General later found that the company had done no wrongdoing. The International Star Registry's FAQ states that only the International Astronomical Union has the right to name stars.

In 1999, the Delaware Museum of Natural History held a contest to name the star TYC 3429-697-1 in the Ursa Major constellation, after the museum purchased naming rights from the International Star Registry. The star was named the "Delaware Diamond", derived from Delaware's nickname "The Diamond State". Despite the nickname not having any scientific validity, a bill recognizing it as the official star of the State of Delaware was passed unanimously by the Delaware General Assembly in 2000.

The International Star Registry named a star after each victim of the September 11 attacks as a memorial.

John Smith's Brewery named stars in a pint glass-shaped constellation after fans who won a competition in 2015. As of 2017, the company had reportedly registered over 2 million stars names.

Jack in the Box partnered with the company to nickname a constellation, shaped like the fast food chain's mascot, after various food items offered by the franchise. The promotion was intended to celebrate the dual occurrence of Star Wars Day and National Space Day in May 2018. That same year, the company ran a promotion with the Sprint Corporation for customers who purchased a Samsung Galaxy S9 or S9+.

In 2019, as the series The Big Bang Theory neared its finale, Warner Bros. Television Studios announced that the ISR had nicknamed the Big Dipper constellation "The Big Bang Dipper" in honor of the show.Disney+ commemorated the launch of the Star content hub in February 2021 by naming several stars in the International Star Registry.

In popular culture 

The company has also appeared in numerous films and television series. In the 2002 romantic coming-of-age film A Walk to Remember depicts a young man (Shane West) naming a star after his girlfriend (Mandy Moore) through the International Star Registry. The International Star Registry appeared in the American Dad! episode "I Ain't No Holodeck Boy", when Hayley buys Roger's homestar, and claims to be his queen as a result.

A 1992 Time magazine article noted that the company had become popular with celebrities and politicians, with Elizabeth II, Charles III, and Diana, Princess of Wales receiving stars. Some stars have been nicknamed as a memorial, such as when William Baldwin nicknamed a star after John F. Kennedy Jr., in the wake of the latter's death. Nicole Kidman named a star in the Hercules constellation "Forever Tom" in the registry, after her husband Tom Cruise. Winona Ryder also named a star after her then-boyfriend Johnny Depp.

Other public figures who have had stars named for them include Barry Manilow, Engelbert Humperdinck, Jon Pertwee, Donald Trump, Hillary Clinton, and Lindsey Graham. Del E. Webb Construction Company named a star after Marco Rubio in 1993. Actor Kirk Douglas had a star named after him for his 99th birthday in 2015. 

In 2012, Anderson Cooper presented guest John Cusack, who had just received a star on the Hollywood Walk of Fame, with a star named after him in the International Star Registry. Ellen DeGeneres presented 5-year old Xander Rynerson with a star named after him on a 2020 episode of The Ellen DeGeneres Show. In a 2020 episode of Jimmy Kimmel Live!, Patrick Stewart had a star named for him after defeating Pete Buttigieg in a Star Trek trivia match.

At the 2015 Academy Awards, nominees were given stars named in their honor and hardcover copies of Your Place in the Cosmos, Vol. 10, inside of their Oscar gift bags.

Bibliography
 Your Place in the Cosmos, Volume I. Total Pages 530; 
 Your Place in the Cosmos, Volume II. Total Pages 508; 
 Your Place in the Cosmos, Volume III. Total Pages 388; 
 Your Place in the Cosmos, Volume IV. Total Pages 502; 
 Your Place in the Cosmos, Volume V. Total Pages 680; 
 Your Place in the Cosmos, Volume VI. Total Pages 717; 
 Your Place in the Cosmos, Volume VII. Total Pages 773; 
 Your Place in the Cosmos, Volume VIII. Total Pages 652; 
 Your Place in the Cosmos, Volume IX. Total Pages 943;

See also
 Extraterrestrial real estate
 Star designation

References

External links
 

Astronomical nomenclature
Business organizations based in the United States
Organizations established in 1979
Companies based in Glenview, Illinois
Novelty items
Memorabilia
Products introduced in 1979